Patrick Wolf (born 1983) is an English musician.

Patrick Wolf may also refer to:

 Patrick Wolf (Austrian footballer) (born 1981)
 Patrick Wolf (German footballer) (born 1989)

See also
 Patrick Wolfe, Canadian candidate, see Results of the Canadian federal election, 2004
 Patrick Wolff (born 1968), chess player
Patrick Wolfe (born 1949), Australian historian
Patrick Woulfe (fl. 1940s–1950s), Irish independent politician and solicitor